The list of ship launches in 1974 includes a chronological list of ships launched in 1974.  In cases where no official launching ceremony was held, the date built or completed may be used instead.


References

See also 

1974
 Ship launches
 Ship launches
Ship launches